Skede may refer to:
Šķēde, suburb of Liepāja, Latvia
Skede, Sweden, village in Vetlanda Municipality, Sweden